This is a directory of properties and districts listed on the National Register of Historic Places in Arizona. There are about fourteen hundred listed sites in the state, and each of its fifteen counties has at least ten listings on the National Register. Forty-seven of the state's sites are further designated as National Historic Landmarks.

Numbers of listings by county 
The following are approximate tallies of current listings in Arizona on the National Register of Historic Places. These counts are based on entries in the National Register Information Database as of April 24, 2008 and new weekly listings posted since then on the National Register of Historic Places web site. There are frequent additions to the listings and occasional delistings, and the counts here are not official. Also, the counts in this table exclude boundary increase and decrease listings which modify the area covered by an existing property or district and which carry a separate National Register reference number.

See also

List of National Historic Landmarks in Arizona
List of bridges on the National Register of Historic Places in Arizona

Notes

References

 
.NRHP
NRHP
Arizona
History of Arizona